

o

ob
obatoclax mesylate (USAN)
oberadilol (INN)
Obestin-30
obeticholic acid (USAN)
obidoxime chloride (INN)
oblimersen (INN)
Oby-Trim

oc

oca-ocr
ocaperidone (INN)
ocfentanil (INN)
ociltide (INN)
ocinaplon (INN)
ocrase (INN)
ocrelizumab (INN)
ocrilate (INN)
ocriplasmin (INN)

oct

octa-octo
octabenzone (INN)
octacaine (INN)
octafonium chloride (INN)
octamoxin (INN)
octamylamine (INN)
octanoic acid (INN)
octapinol (INN)
octastine (INN)
octatropine methylbromide (INN)
octaverine (INN)
octazamide (INN)
octenidine (INN)
octimibate (INN)
Octocaine
octocog alfa (INN)
octocrilene (INN)
octodrine (INN)
octopamine (INN)
octotiamine (INN)
octoxinol (INN)

octr
Octreoscan
octreotide (INN)
octriptyline (INN)
octrizole (INN)

ocu
Ocuclear
Ocufen
Ocuflox
Ocumycin
Ocupress
Ocusert Pilo
Ocusulf

od-og
odanacatib (USAN)
odulimomab (INN)
ofatumumab (INN)
oglufanide disodium (USAN)

ol
olaflur (INN)
olanzapine (INN)
olaquindox (INN)
olaratumab (USAN)
oleandomycin (INN)
Oleptro (Angelini-Labopharm)
oletimol (INN)
olivomycin (INN)
olmidine (INN)
olmesartan (USAN, (INN))
olodaterol (INN)
olopatadine (INN)
olpadronic acid (INN)
olpimedone (INN)
olprinone (INN)
olradipine (INN)
olsalazine (INN)
oltipraz (INN)
Olux (Stiefel Laboratories)
olvanil (INN)

om-on
omacetaxine mepesuccinate (USAN)
omadacycline (USAN, INN)
omalizumab (INN)
omapatrilat (INN)
omecamtiv mecarbil (USAN, INN)
omeprazole (INN)
omidoline (INN)
omiganan (USAN)
omiloxetine (INN)
Omnicef
Omnipaque
Omnipen
Omnitarg
omtriptolide sodium (USAN)
Omniscan
omoconazole (INN)
omonasteine (INN)
Ona Mast
onabotulinumtoxinA (USAN)
onaclostox (former USAN)
onamelatucel-L (USAN)
onapristone (INN)
Oncaspar (Enzon)
Oncovin (Eli Lilly)
ondansetron (INN)
onercept (USAN)
onrehi (INN)
onsifocon A (USAN)
Ontak (Seragen, Inc)
ontazolast (INN)

op
opanixil (INN)
Opcon
opebacan (INN)
Ophthaine
Ophthetic
Ophthochlor
Ophthocort
opiniazide (INN)
opipramol (INN)
opium
opratonium iodide (INN)
oprelvekin (INN)
Opticrom
Optimark
Optimine
Optipranolol
Optison
Optivar
Optomycin